Natalie Osborne is a fictional character from the British Channel 4 soap opera, Hollyoaks, played by Tiffany Mulheron. She made her first appearance during an episode broadcast in July 2003 and left in 2004.

Casting
Mulheron originally auditioned for the role of Roxy, a guest character, who was later murdered by serial killer Toby Mills (Henry Luxemburg). Mulheron commented, "I don't think I was suitable, which was lucky for me. It was a good part but she didn't live for very long."

Mulheron decided to leave at the end of her contract in October 2004, so she could pursue different film and television roles.

Development
Natalie had several love interests during her time in the show, and Mulheron thought her character was "quite tarty". Natalie often wore revealing clothing, which she used to "show off her body to snare men." Mulheron said viewers would be surprised to meet her in real life, as she was always covered up. She also said that she and Natalie were very dissimilar. Mulheron called Natalie "a very bad girl" and explained that she loved playing her, as she was "a bitch." She added that before Natalie's scenes, she would stop and think of all the "bitchy things" she could.

Storylines
Natalie was Jack's Scottish niece who came to stay with her uncle after refusing to go back to the small village she came from. She was blonde and attractive and she knew it. She annoyed Jack's lodger Izzy Davies (Elize du Toit) by stealing her clothes and make-up, and flirting outrageously with her boyfriend Ben Davies (Marcus Patric). She also proved to be work-shy and, along with her cousin Darren Osborne (Ashley Taylor Dawson), a trouble maker. She made no friends during her time in the village as she was extremely bitchy and was always trying to steal someone else's boyfriend.

Her love life was also unpredictable as she shared a brief love affair with Darren, but rejected his later advances, until he began dating Debbie Dean (Jodi Albert). Natalie and Darren begin an affair. Debbie's jealousy led to a ketchup fight between the girls in the pub before Debbie broke up with Darren. By this time Natalie did not want him and managed to seduce Craig Dean (Guy Burnett) and he lost his virginity to her. Her treatment of Craig was mean, and she was taught a lesson by Craig's sisters Debbie and Steph Dean (Carley Stenson) who had both had an intense dislike of Natalie since she arrived. She was horrified when her little sister Rachel Osborne (Lucy Evans) arrived and vowed to get rid of her as soon as possible. After weeks of fighting and squabbling, the final straw came when Jack found out about her failing her exams due to the lack of work and also her second pregnancy but not knowing who the father was. Despite using her charms, Jack told Rachel and Natalie that they were being sent home. Rachel was delighted and Natalie flounced off back to Scotland.

Reception
At the 2004 British Soap Awards, Mulheron was nominated in the category of Sexiest Female for her portrayal of Natalie. Virgin Media profiled some of Hollyoaks''' "hottest females" in their opinion, of Natalie they stated: "The claws were out when Jack Osborne's niece, Natalie, landed in Hollyoaks. The sexy madam charmed the pants off many a man during her brief stay but she was unceremoniously sent back to Scotland after getting pregnant." James Hastings of the Daily Mirror'' branded the character a "man-eater" and a "spoilt temptress".

References

Hollyoaks characters
Television characters introduced in 2003
Fictional Scottish people
Female characters in television
Osborne family (Hollyoaks)